Playami Beach is a beach in Tijuana. It is the site of Los Arcos, or The Arches, of Playas de Tijuana. Playami is located on the boardwalk that runs down the northern length of Tijuana's coastline. Playami beach is also known as Playas de Tijuana. 
Playas de Tijuana is a community that is known for its tranquility, kindness and harmony. The sunsets are Playas de Tijuana presence of great beauty, as you can see the Pacific Ocean, Coronado Island and Coronado Bay and the skyscrapers of downtown San Diego, California.

References

Beaches of Tijuana